The splanchnic nerves are paired visceral nerves (nerves that contribute to the innervation of the internal organs), carrying fibers of the autonomic nervous system (visceral efferent fibers) as well as sensory fibers from the organs (visceral afferent fibers).  All carry sympathetic fibers except for the pelvic splanchnic nerves, which carry parasympathetic fibers.

Types
The term splanchnic nerves can refer to:
 Cardiopulmonary nerves
 Thoracic splanchnic nerves (greater, lesser, and least)
 Lumbar splanchnic nerves
 Sacral splanchnic nerves
 Pelvic splanchnic nerves

References

Autonomic nervous system